Unibit may refer to:
 Unibit (drill bit), a roughly conical drill bit with a stairstep profile
 Unibit (unit), 1 bit of information
 Unibit PLL, a type of phase-locked loop (PLL)
 Unibit (font), an opensource Chinese font containing Chinese, Japanese, and Korean languages ideographs